William Wynn  (1876 – 1944) was a Welsh international footballer. He was part of the Wales national football team, playing one match on 28  March 1903 against Ireland. At club level, he played for Shrewsbury Town.

See also
 List of Wales international footballers (alphabetical)

References

1876 births
1944 deaths
Welsh footballers
Wales international footballers
Shrewsbury Town F.C. players
Place of birth missing
Date of death missing
Association footballers not categorized by position